Salang is a district of the Simeulue Regency on Simeulue island in the Indonesian province of Aceh.  At the 2010 Census it had a total population of 7,625 people, living in 1,495 households in 2005.

Administrative divisions
Salang is divided administratively into 16 desa / kelurahan:

 Along
 Bunga
 Ganang Pusako
 Jaya Baru
 Karya Bakti
 Kenangan Jaya
 Lalla Bahagia
 Meunafah
 Mutiara
 Nasreuhe
 Padang Unoi
 Panton Lawe
 Suak Manang
 Tameng
 Tamon
 Ujung Salang

References

Districts of Aceh